Badr al-Din Solamish (1272–1291; , royal name: al-Malik al-Adil Badr al-Din Solamish)  was a  Sultan of Egypt in 1279. Born in Cairo, he was the son of  Baibars, a sultan of Kipchak origin. 

Upon Baibars' death, his son al-Said Barakah took power, but as he was replacing his father's amirs with his own, three of the more powerful ones banded together and forced Barakah to abdicate after only two years.  Barakah was replaced by the seven-year-old Solamish, with Qalawun, one of the amirs who had forced Barakah to abdicate, as guardian.  A few months later, Solamish was deposed by Qalawun, who took the title of sultan for himself.

He died at Constantinople in 1291.

References

 Reuven Amitai-Preiss (1995), Mongols and Mamluks: The Mamluk-Īlkhānid War, 1260-1281, pp. 179-225. Cambridge University Press, .

1272 births
1291 deaths
Royalty from Cairo
Bahri sultans
Monarchs deposed as children
Medieval child monarchs
13th-century Mamluk sultans
People of Cuman descent